Giuseppe Gandolfo (28 August 1792 – 13 September 1855) was an Italian painter, active mainly in Sicily in a Neoclassical style.

He was born in Catania, Sicily, and moved to Rome to study under Giuseppe Errante, then briefly moved to Florence to work under Pietro Benvenuti. In Florence, he made a number of copies of classic works. Among his own designs were a Diogenes, Holy Family, Apollo plays his lyre, Mary Magdalen, and a Telemachus, Agamemnon and Idomeneo''. He was also prized for portraits.

References

1792 births
1855 deaths
19th-century Italian painters
19th-century Italian male artists
Italian male painters
Painters from Sicily
Artists from Catania
Italian neoclassical painters